Ameghino is a lunar impact crater located to the north of the Sinus Successus, a bay in the northeast part of Mare Fecunditatis. Less than 15 kilometers to the northwest of Ameghino were the landing sites of the Soviet Luna 18 and Luna 20 probes.

This formation was designated Apollonius C before being given a name by the IAU, in honour of the Argentine scientific and paleontologist Florentino Ameghino. Apollonius itself is located to the east-northeast.

References

External links

 LTO-62D3 Ameghino — L&PI topographic map

Impact craters on the Moon